The men's standing long jump was a track & field athletics event at the 1900 Summer Olympics in Paris. It was held on July 16, 1900. Four athletes from two nations competed in the standing long jump. The event was won by Ray Ewry of the United States, with his teammate Irving Baxter the runner-up; the two dominated all three of the standing jumps in 1900, finishing first and second in each. Ewry would take gold medals in all eight standing jump events from 1900 to 1908 (as well as both events at the 1906 Intercalated Games). The bronze medal was won by Émile Torchebœuf of France.

Background

This was the first appearance of the event, which was held four times from 1900 to 1912.

Competition format

There was a single round of jumping.

Records

There was no extent world record. This was the first appearance of the event at the Olympics, so there was no Olympic record either. Ray Ewry set the initial Olympic record with 3.21 metres.

Schedule

Results

Ewry won all three of the standing jumps in 1900. Just as in the others, he had little difficulty winning the standing long jump, also setting the first Olympic record.

References

Sources
 International Olympic Committee.
 De Wael, Herman. Herman's Full Olympians: "Athletics 1900". Accessed 18 March 2006.
 

Men's jumping z standing long
Long jump at the Olympics